Stiliani ("Stella") Papadopoulou (born March 15, 1982) is a hammer thrower from Greece. She was born in Thessaloniki. Her personal best throw is 72.10 metres, achieved in July 2008 in Nikiti. This is the Greek record.

She finished eleventh at the 2008 Olympic Games. She also competed at the 2004 Olympic Games and the 2005 World Championships without reaching the finals.

Achievements

References

1982 births
Living people
Greek female hammer throwers
Athletes (track and field) at the 2004 Summer Olympics
Athletes (track and field) at the 2008 Summer Olympics
Olympic athletes of Greece
Athletes from Thessaloniki
Mediterranean Games bronze medalists for Greece
Mediterranean Games medalists in athletics
Athletes (track and field) at the 2009 Mediterranean Games
21st-century Greek women